The 2017 Baltic States Swimming Championships was held in Riga, Latvia, from March 31 – April 1

Some events were also held separately for boys and girls (Baltic States Youth Swimming Meet).

Medal table

Senior

Total

Events 
Freestyle: 50 m, 100 m, 200 m, 400 m
Backstroke: 50 m, 100 m, 200 m
Breaststroke: 50 m, 100 m, 200 m
Butterfly: 50 m, 100 m, 200 m
Individual medley: 200 m, 400 m
Relay: 4×100 m free, 4×100 m medley

Results

Men's events

Women's events

References

Results swimrankings.net

2017
2017 in Latvian sport
2017 in swimming
International sports competitions hosted by Latvia
Sports competitions in Riga
March 2017 sports events in Europe
April 2017 sports events in Europe